The women's 3000 meter at the 2021 KNSB Dutch Single Distance Championships in Heerenveen took place at Thialf ice skating rink on Saturday 31 October 2020.

Statistics

Result

Source:

Referee: Wycher Bos. Assistant: Björn Fetlaar.  Starter: Raymond Micka

Draw

References 

Single Distance Championships
2021 Single Distance
World